The Hiawatha Sportsman's Club 1931 Maintenance Building and Commissary are two recreational buildings located on Lake Boulevard, on the grounds of the Hiawatha Sportsman's Club, near Millecoquins, Michigan. The buildings were listed on the National Register of Historic Places in 2011.

History

In the 1920s, Dr. William E. McNamara of Lansing, Michigan purchased  of land in Michigan's Upper Peninsula. In 1927, McNamara organized the Hiawatha Sportsman's Club for the purpose of hunting, fishing, and relaxing in a relatively unspoiled environment.

In the late 1920s, the population of Engadine, Michigan, was dwindling due to the description of the main industry in town. In 1931, the club purchased an empty Engadine store and moved it onto the club property to serve as a commissary. The first two commissary managers went on to found grocery stores in nearby towns: Joseph Patrick Rahilly in Newberry, Michigan, and Emmet Joseph Vallier in Naubinway, Michigan. The commissary is currently used by the Hiawatha Sportsman's Club Art Group for painting.

Also in 1931, the club constructed a clapboard-covered frame structure nearby to use as a maintenance building. The building served as the maintenance center for the club until 1946; it was used for storage until the mid-1970s.

See also

References

External links

Hiawatha Sportsman's Club official page

Buildings and structures in Mackinac County, Michigan
Buildings and structures completed in 1931
Clubhouses on the National Register of Historic Places in Michigan
National Register of Historic Places in Mackinac County, Michigan